Vale is a city in and the county seat of Malheur County, Oregon, United States, about  west of the Idaho border. It is at the intersection of U.S. Routes 20 and 26, on the Malheur River at its confluence with Bully Creek.

Vale was selected as Malheur's county seat in 1888 in a vote where other candidate communities were Ontario and Jordan Valley. As of the 2010 census, the city had a total population of 1,874, down from 1,976 in 2000. Vale is part of the Ontario, OR–ID Micropolitan Statistical Area.

History
The area where present-day Vale sits was historically home to small groups of Native Americans. The area was also a central gathering place for Paiutes during salmon run season.

The community was the first stop in Oregon along the Oregon Trail. Journals of those who traveled the trail note a trading post in the area as early as 1853, and by 1864, Johnathan Keeney had built a cabin and a barn that he offered for lodging for passing travelers. This cabin was replaced by the Rinehart House in 1872, which still stands today.

The railroad arrived in Vale in 1883, and the town became an important shipping gateway. A post office with the name of Vale was established in the Rinehart House the same year, though the community was not incorporated by the Oregon Legislative Assembly until February 21, 1889. Originally incorporated as the Town of Vale, it became the City of Vale in 1905. In 1887, Vale was named the first Malheur County seat, and a courthouse was constructed.

Geography

Climate
Vale has a semi-arid climate (Köppen BSk). July is on average the hottest month and January the coldest. Typically there will be 148.3 nights each winter falling below  and 6.3 nights falling under , although the clear skies mean that only 25.2 days do not top freezing and only 101.5 days fail to top . During summer, 12.7 days will top  and 61.2 days – including 43 of 62 in July and August – will on average top . However, the low humidity and clear high-altitude skies mean nights are cool even in summer, with minima rarely above .

Demographics

2010 census

As of the census of 2010, there were 1,874 people, 669 households, and 441 families residing in the city. The racial makeup of the city was 86.7% White, 0.3% African American, 1.3% Native American, 0.4% Asian, 0.3% Pacific Islander, 8.2% from other races, and 2.8% from two or more races. Hispanic or Latino of any race were 23.4% of the population.

There were 669 households, of which 38.1% had children under the age of 18 living with them, 47.8% were married couples living together, 12.0% had a female householder with no husband present, 6.1% had a male householder with no wife present, and 34.1% were non-families. 28.7% of all households were made up of individuals, and 13.9% had someone living alone who was 65 years of age or older. The average household size was 2.64 and the average family size was 3.27.

The median age in the city was 33.4 years. About 29% of residents were under the age of 18; 10.4% were between the ages of 18 and 24; 24.8% were from 25 to 44; 19.7% were from 45 to 64; and 16.4% were 65 years of age or older. The gender makeup of the city was 50.5% male and 49.5% female.

As of the census of 2000, the median income for a household in the city was $27,065, and the median income for a family was $33,355. Males had a median income of $27,176 versus $22,500 for females. The per capita income for the city was $11,943. About 20% of the population and 15.6 percent of families had incomes below the poverty line. Out of the total population, 27.8% of those under the age of 18 and 12.2% of those 65 and older were living below the poverty line.

Transportation

In the 21st century, Vale is a stop on the Eastern POINT intercity bus line between Bend and Ontario. It makes one stop per day in each direction.

 Miller Memorial Airpark

Education
Vale is within the Vale School District 84. It has grades K-12.

See also
Bully Creek Reservoir

References

External links

City of Vale Website 
Entry for Vale in the Oregon Blue Book
Vale community profile from Malheur County website
Vale Chamber of Commerce
Map of Vale in PDF format

 
County seats in Oregon
Oregon Trail
Ontario, Oregon micropolitan area
Populated places established in 1883
1883 establishments in Oregon
Cities in Oregon
Cities in Malheur County, Oregon